Pseudochondrostoma is a genus of cyprinid fish that occurs in the Iberian Peninsula.

Species
There are currently three recognized species in this genus:
 Pseudochondrostoma duriense (M. M. Coelho, 1985)
 Pseudochondrostoma polylepis (Steindachner, 1864) (Iberian nase)
 Pseudochondrostoma willkommii (Steindachner, 1866)

References

 
Fish of Europe